Christian August Seydel founded the C. A. Seydel Söhne harmonica factory in Klingenthal, Sachsen in 1847. The firm remains the oldest harmonica factory in the world and manufactures a wide range of harmonicas.

History 
In the 17th century the Seydel family were miners in Sachsenberg-Georgenthal/Saxony. When mining ceased in Saxony Vogtland, the brothers Johann Christian Seydel and Christian August Seydel began working as instrument makers. Both subsequently became approved harmonica makers. This was decreed by the court of Untersachsenberg on October 27, 1847.

The certificate contains the first documented reference to the company, with Christian August Seydel being registered as the company founder. The factory was established in Klingenthal at the foot of the famous Aschberg (literally 'Ash Mountain') and became one of the biggest harmonica factories in Saxony. In 1882, C.A. Seydel died, and his son Richard took over. One year later his brother Moritz joined them, and the company name changed to C.A.Seydel Söhne (C.A. Seydel and Sons).

Seydel harmonicas

Blues (diatonic) models
1847 series - This series includes the Classic, Silver and Noble. All are similar but the classic has a wood comb, Silver has a plastic comb and the Noble has an aluminum comb with vented sides. The 160th anniversary model is similar but with luxury components and is only available in the key of C. Only 160 of these were produced. These models have stainless steel reeds.

Lightning - The latest and top-of-the-line 1847 model is the Lightning, made of steel including the comb. Aside from the luxury components and extra attention to every detail the biggest feature is the use of polished steel reeds. The polishing process adds to the quality of the sound and the longevity of the reeds, removing any future spots for reed failure. The comb being made of steel makes this model heftier to hold. The quality of the finish including the highly buffed mouth holes make it extremely comfortable to hold and to play.

Big Six - These models have only six holes with stainless steel reeds. The classic model is only available in the key of C and has a wood comb. The standard model is available in six keys and six colors. The blues version is tuned like the first six holes of a standard diatonic. The folk version is tuned to holes 4–9 on a standard diatonic.

Session Steel - This model has an orange plastic comb (or other colors if a Summer or Winter edition harmonica). It has stainless steel reeds and full length covers.

Favorite - This model has brass reeds and an aluminum comb.

Session - This model is the same as the Session Steel but with brass reeds and a black comb. The "antique" version has brass colored cover plates.

Soloist Pro - This model is similar to the Hohner Marine Band 1896, but with rounded holes and screws.

Soloist Pro 12 Steel - This model is similar to the Hohner SBS. However, this model has 12 holes instead of 14 is available in Low C, Low D, C, and A. The idea is that one gets a low octave under the standard diatonic. However compared to the SBS, this model is missing the 10 hole on a standard diatonic.

Chromatic models 
Symphony - High-end 16-holer with stainless steel reeds.

Saxony - This model is a chromatic harmonica with stainless steel reeds.

De Luxe - High-end chromatic model with brass reeds.

De Luxe Steel - Same as the De Luxe, with stainless steel reeds and an improved mouthpiece.

Standard - Standard chromatic model with brass reeds.

Tremolo and octave models 
Fanfare-S - This model is a tremolo model with stainless steel reeds.

Fanfare - This model is the same as Fanfare-S with brass reeds.

Sailor - Standard model with brass reeds.

Sailor Steel - Traditionally-shaped tremolo harmonica with stainless steel reeds and Richter-tuning.

Mountain harp - Standard model, larger than Sailor model.

Concerto - Octave model with brass reeds.

Club- Curved octave harmonica.

Notable Seydel harmonica players 
 Ashay Kumar
 Pat Bergeson
 James Cotton
 PT Gazelle
 Mark Hummel
 Aki Kumar
 Lazy Lester
 Charlie Musselwhite
 Sugar Ray Norcia
 Zack Pomerleau
 Matthew Prozialeck
 Peter "Madcat" Ruth
 Rob Stone
 Will Wilde
 Frédéric Yonnet
 Bonny B.
 Ofir Ventura

External links
Lars Seifert interview NAMM Oral History Library (2008)
Karl Pucholt interview NAMM Oral History Library (2008)
The Harmonica Company

Seydel
Harmonica manufacturers
Companies based in Saxony